India's Forbidden Love is a 2018 Tamil language documentary film directed by Sadhana Subramanian and produced by Grain Media. The film rotates around the tale of a young lady named Kausalya, whose spouse was thrashed to death by a gang of goons on a highway.

In 2019, India’s Forbidden Love was nominated for the International Emmy Awards in the Best Documentary category.

Synopsis 
The documentary was filmed in Tamil Nadu’s Tiruppur district and revolves around the survivor of a brutal honour killing Kausalya who testifies against her parents in the murder trial of her lower-caste husband. The film also covers the pain, fear and challenges that Kausalya has gone through.

Sadhana Subramanian who is an investigative journalist has directed the film.

People featured 
 Kausalya
 Shankar

References

External links 

 

Indian documentaries
2018 films
2018 television films
2018 documentary films
Documentary films about honor killing